For the Taken is the debut and only studio album by American rock band Mercy Fall released on May 9, 2006. First single "I Got Life" was released to radio stations on March 4. The song spent eight weeks on the Billboard Mainstream Rock chart where it peaked at number 36. 
Corey Apar of Allmusic called the album "a competent debut that could be the start of better things for them."

Track listing

Personnel
Howard Benson – producer
Blake "Black" Allison – drums, vocals
Joey Chicago – bass guitar, vocals
Jeff Lesby – lead vocals
Jeff James – guitar, vocals

References

External links
For the Taken at Discogs

2006 debut albums